Clementina Ciana Agricole (born 18 July 1988) is a Seychellois female weightlifter, competing in the  and  category and representing Seychelles at international competitions. She competed at world championships, including at the 2015 World Weightlifting Championships. She won the bronze medal at the 2016 African Weightlifting Championships.

She was the flag bearer at the 2014 Commonwealth Games Parade of Nations.

Career
Agricole entered the 2010 Commonwealth Games held in Delhi, India. Before the competition she had seen doctors about headaches she had been suffering which were put down to migraines. During the competition she suffered an elbow injury but managed to finish in fourth place. During the competition she was still having bad headaches, but while in the games village she lost her vision and blacked out. She was rushed to hospital where a scan showed a brain tumour. Aater undergoing an operation, she remained in Delhi for another 45 days to help her recovery. She underwent another major operation in November 2011. 12 months later she was declared fit to begin weightlifting again, and entered the National Championships in November 2012.

Since her return she came second at the 2013 Commonwealth Championships, fourth at the 2014 Commonwealth Games, and 26th at the 2015 World Weightlifting Championships. Agricole won three medals (one silver and two bronze) at the 2015 All-African Games held in Brazzaville, Republic of the Congo.

In 2015 she began to train with an American coach Kyle Pierce and ranked first at the IOIG. She won three medals in the  category (one silver and two bronze) at the 2015 African Games held in Brazzaville, Republic of the Congo with a  snatch, and a  clean and jerk. She ranked 26th at the World Weightlifting Championships.
Despite winning three bronze medals at the African Weightlifting Championships in 2016, the Seychelles Weightlifting Association did not put Agricole on the team to participate to the Olympic Games. She stopped training with the national coach William Dixie and September 2016 began to train with a French-Lebanese coach and physical trainer, Zaher Hamdan, who had lived in Seychelles since 2007.

In March 2017 she was banned by the SWA for "misbehavior" and was not allowed compete in weightlifting locally or internationally. She hired a lawyer and had the decision revoked.

Despite not being permitted to compete in weightlifting she kept on training doing powerlifting with Hamdan, and after six months she managed to become the 2017 French Open Champion in weightlifting. She then participated in the  African Championships and the Commonwealth Championships where she won the Gold medal.

In 2017 the International Weightlifting Federation banned nine countries for doping - Armenia, Azerbaijan, Belarus, China, Moldova, Kazakhstan, Russia, Turkey and Ukraine.

Agricole participated to the 2018 Commonwealth Games which was held in Gold Cost, Australia. Six weeks before the competition she had an injection of cortisone in her right shoulder. In the competition she suffered a dislocated shoulder in her third attempt in snatch after doing  with her second snatch and then failed on all of her attempts in clean and jerk. She was rushed to hospital where a scan showed two tears on the supraspinatus muscles and on the biceps tendons. She underwent an operation and remained in Gold Cost for another two weeks before being allowed to return home.

Awards
In 2014, she won the Seychelles Sportswoman of the Year Award for the second consecutive year. Eleven years earlier she had won the Young Female Athlete of the Year Award, and she has twice won the Seychelles Female Lifter of the Year in 2009 and 2013.

Major results

References

External links

1988 births
Living people
Seychellois female weightlifters
Place of birth missing (living people)
Weightlifters at the 2010 Commonwealth Games
Weightlifters at the 2014 Commonwealth Games
Weightlifters at the 2022 Commonwealth Games
African Games bronze medalists for Seychelles
African Games medalists in weightlifting
Competitors at the 2007 All-Africa Games
Competitors at the 2015 African Games
Competitors at the 2019 African Games
Commonwealth Games competitors for Seychelles
African Weightlifting Championships medalists
20th-century Seychellois people
21st-century Seychellois people